William James Goodacre (August 15, 1951 – January 27, 2019) was a Canadian politician, who represented the electoral district of Bulkley Valley-Stikine in the Legislative Assembly of British Columbia from 1996 to 2001. He was a member of the New Democratic Party.

He received a degree in economics from the University of British Columbia and worked as a grocer for Goodacre's Stores Ltd. Goodacre was married to Mary Etta Cloud and served on the town council for Smithers, British Columbia. He died on January 27, 2019.

References 

1951 births
2019 deaths
British Columbia New Democratic Party MLAs
British Columbia municipal councillors
People from Smithers, British Columbia